Juyom (also Romanized as Jūyom; also known as Juwūn, Jūyum, and Zhoyūm) is a city and capital of Juyom District, in Larestan County, Fars Province, Iran.  At the 2006 census, its population was 6,396, in 1,397 families.

References

Populated places in Larestan County
Cities in Fars Province